Camerarius may have the following meanings:

Synonymous to titles:
 Chamberlain
 (one of) Papal Gentlemen
 Camerlengo
 Kammerer

As a surname; previously as a Latinization of Chamberlain (surname) or Kammerer:
 Elias Rudolph Camerarius Sr.
 Elias Rudolph Camerarius Jr.
 Joachim Camerarius the Elder (1500–1574), German classical scholar
 Joachim Camerarius the Younger (1534–1598), German botanist and physician
 Rudolf Jakob Camerarius (1665–1721), German botanist and physician

Latin-language surnames
Occupational surnames